The 1960 Wimbledon Championships took place on the outdoor grass courts at the All England Lawn Tennis and Croquet Club in Wimbledon, London, United Kingdom. The tournament ran from Monday 20 June until Saturday 2 July 1960. It was the 74th staging of the Wimbledon Championships, and the third Grand Slam tennis event of 1960. Neale Fraser and Maria Bueno won the singles titles.

Champions

Seniors

Men's singles

 Neale Fraser defeated  Rod Laver, 6–4, 3–6, 9–7, 7–5

Women's singles

 Maria Bueno defeated  Sandra Reynolds, 8–6, 6–0

Men's doubles

 Rafael Osuna /  Dennis Ralston defeated  Mike Davies /  Bobby Wilson, 7–5, 6–3, 10–8

Women's doubles

 Maria Bueno /  Darlene Hard defeated  Sandra Reynolds /  Renée Schuurman, 6–4, 6–0

Mixed doubles

 Rod Laver /  Darlene Hard defeated  Robert Howe /  Maria Bueno, 13–11, 3–6, 8–6

Juniors

Boys' singles

 Rod Mandelstam defeated  Jaidip Mukerjea, 1–6, 8–6, 6–4

Girls' singles

 Karen Hantze defeated  Lynne Hutchings, 6–4, 6–4

References

External links
 Official Wimbledon Championships website

 
Wimbledon Championships
Wimbledon Championships
Wimbledon Championships
Wimbledon Championships